This is a list of films released in Greece in 2013.

Highest-grossing films
The top ten 2013 released films in Greece are as follows:

Box office number-one films
This is a list of films which have placed number one at the weekend box office in Greece during 2013.

Notes

References
 Note: Click on the relevant weekend to view specifics.

See also
 List of Greek films - Greek films by year
 Cinema of Greece

2013 in Greece
Greece
2013